Sheila Bromley (born Sheila LeGay; October 31, 1911 – July 23, 2003), (The reference work Obituaries in the Performing Arts, 2003 gave her birth date as October 31, 1907). sometimes billed as Sheila LeGay, Sheila Manners, Sheila Mannors or Sheila Manors, was an American television and film actress. She is best known for her roles in B-movies, mostly Westerns of the era.

Early years
Bromely was born in San Francisco, California. She attended Hollywood High School, and her first acting experience came at the Pasadena Playhouse. She was a Miss California.

Career
Bromley began her career in the early 1930s on contract with Monogram Pictures, she was first billed as Sheila LeGay starring in 1930 westerns alongside Tom Tyler. She frequently co-starred with Ken Maynard, Hoot Gibson, Johnny Mack Brown, Bill Cody, and Dick Foran. She first starred alongside Bill Cody in the 1932 western Land of Wanted Men. She starred opposite John Wayne in the 1935 films Westward Ho & Lawless Range and the 1937 film Idol of the Crowds. Bromley appeared uncredited in the Marx Brothers film  Horse Feathers (1932) where she delivered the famous line "The Dean is furious! He's waxing wroth!" In 1944, she appeared in the touring production of Good Night Ladies.  Bromley performed on Broadway in Time for Elizabeth (1948).

In 1960, she appeared as a central character Mrs. Spencer alongside Paul Brinegars character Wishbone in the Rawhide episode "Incident of the Deserter". She appeared in one episode of I Love Lucy as Helen Erickson Kaiser, the childhood friend of Lucy Ricardo. She also made five guest appearances on Perry Mason during the series' nine-year run on CBS. In her first appearance in 1959 she played co-defendant Agnes Nulty in The Case of the Borrowed Brunette. In 1962 she played murderer Elizabeth Dow in The Case of the Mystified Miner. She also guest-starred in a 1965 episode of The Cara Williams Show.

During World War II she worked often for the USO, continuing that service until the war ended in 1945. There she met her husband Jairus Bellamy. She is credited with seventy-five films in her career, of which seventeen were westerns, for which she is best known. Bromley retired from films in the 1970s and lived in the Greater Los Angeles Area until her death in 2003.

Death
On July 23, 2003, Bromley died in Los Angeles, California. The reference work Obituaries in the Performing Arts, 2003 gave her age as 95.

Selected filmography

 Call of the Desert (1930) - Jean Walker
 The Canyon of Missing Men (1930) – Inez Sepulveda
The Storm (1930) – Girl with Horse and Buggy (uncredited)
 Playthings of Hollywood (1930) – Beth King
Ten Nights in a Barroom (1931) – June Manners
Daddy Long Legs (1931) – Gloria
The Lawyer's Secret (1931) – Madge – Madame X's Girlfriend (uncredited)
Land of Wanted Men (1931) – Cynthia
Girls About Town (1931) – Party Girl (uncredited)
Working Girls (1931) – Carrie (uncredited)
Texas Gun Fighter (1932) – Jane Adams
She Wanted a Millionaire (1932) – Beauty Contest Contestant (uncredited)
Lady with a Past (1932) – Party Guest (uncredited)
Texas Pioneers (1932) – Nancy Thomas
Play Girl (1932) – Wedding Girl (scenes deleted)
One Hour with You (1932) – Colette's Downstairs Maid (uncredited)
Lady and Gent (1932) – Hat Check Girl (uncredited)
Winner Take All (1932) – Joan's Friend (uncredited)
Horse Feathers (1932) – Wagstaff's Receptionist (uncredited)
Tiger Shark (1932) – 'Red' (uncredited)
Cowboy Counsellor (1932) – Ruth Avery
Her First Mate (1933) – Passenger on Boat Deck (uncredited)
Meet the Baron (1933) – Equestrienne Wearing Black Vest (uncredited)
Only Yesterday (1933) – May (uncredited)
King for a Night (1933) – Telephone Operator (uncredited)
The Woman Condemned (1934) – The Actress
Glamour (1934) – Chorus Girl (uncredited)
The Hell Cat (1934) – Minor Role (uncredited)
That's Gratitude (1934) – Delia Maxwell
The Merry Widow (1934) – Sonia's Maid (uncredited)
The Prescott Kid (1934) – Dolores Ortega
Behind the Evidence (1935) – Ruth Allen
Carnival (1935) – Puppet Assistant (uncredited)
Danger Ahead (1935) – Lorraine Matthews
Together We Live (1935) – Mary
Westward Ho (1935) – Mary Gordon
Moonlight on the Prairie (1935) – Barbara Roberts
Lawless Range (1935) – Ann Mason
The Pace That Kills (1935) – Fanny
Desert Phantom (1936) – Jean Halloran
Kelly of the Secret Service (1936) – Sally Flint
Born to Fight (1936) – Ada
Lady Be Careful (1936) – Hazel
Gold Diggers of 1937 (1936) – Chorus Girl (uncredited)
Idol of the Crowds (1937) – Helen Dale
West of Shanghai (1937) – Lola Galt
 Luck of Roaring Camp (1937) – Susan Oakhurst
Missing Witnesses (1937) – Gladys Wagner
Midnight Interlude (1938) – Peggy Reitter
Making the Headlines (1938) – Grace Sandford
King of the Newsboys (1938) – Connie Madison
Accidents Will Happen (1938) – Nona Gregg 
Mystery House (1938) – Terice Von Elm
Reformatory (1938) – Mrs. Regan
Rebellious Daughters (1938) – Flo
Girls on Probation (1938) – Hilda Engstrom
Nancy Drew... Reporter (1939) – Bonnie Lucas
Women in the Wind (1939) – Frieda Boreman
Death Goes North (1939) – Elsie Barlow
Waterfront (1939) – Marie Cordell aka Mary Allen
Torchy Blane... Playing with Dynamite (1939) – 'Jackie' McGuire
Torture Ship (1939) – Poison Mary Slavish
Thou Shalt Not Kill (1939) – Julie Mancini
Calling Philo Vance (1940) – Doris
A Fugitive from Justice (1940) – Ruby Patterson
Time to Kill (1942) – Lois Morny
The House on 92nd Street (1945) – Beauty Parlor Customer (uncredited)
A Star Is Born (1954) – Shrine Auditorium Reporter (uncredited)
There's Always Tomorrow (1956) – Woman from Pasadena
World in My Corner (1956) – Mrs. Mallinson
A Day of Fury (1956) – Marie
Spoilers of the Forest (1957) – Linda Mitchell
The Lawless Eighties (1957) – Mrs. Myra Sutter
Ice Palace (1960) – Lucy Husack (uncredited)
Young Jesse James (1960) – Mrs. Samuels
Judgment at Nuremberg (1961) – Mrs. Ives (uncredited)
For Those Who Think Young (1964) – Mrs. Harkness
The Girls on the Beach (1965) – Mrs. Winters
Hotel (1967) – Mrs. Grandin
Nightmare Circus (1974) – Mrs. Baynes

References

External links

 
 
 
 Sheila Bromley at b-westerns.com

1911 births
2003 deaths
20th-century American actresses
21st-century American women
Actresses from San Francisco
American film actresses
American television actresses
Hollywood High School alumni
Western (genre) film actresses